Sri Balagangadharanatha Swamiji Stn., Hosahalli is a metro station on the Purple Line of the Namma Metro serving Hosahalli, Bangalore. It was opened to the public on 16 November 2015.

History
On 16 November 2015, Union Minister of Chemicals and Fertilisers H.N. Ananth Kumar requested the Karnataka Government to rename the station after Balagangadharanatha Swamiji, a Vokkaliga seer. The request was supported by Union Urban Development Minister M. Venkaiah Naidu. Karnataka Chief Minister Siddaramaiah had "no objection" to naming the station after the seer and had an "open mind" on the issue. The Hosahalli station is located near the Adichunchanagiri Mahasamsthana, a religious mutt owned by the Vokkaliga community. Although the station has not yet been renamed, it is referred to as "Sri Balagangadhara Natha Swamiji Station – Hosahalli" in announcements on the Namma Metro.

Station layout

Entry/Exits
There are 3 Entry/Exit points – A, B and C. Commuters can use either of the points for their travel.

 Entry/Exit point A: Towards BSNL Telephone exchange – has stairs as well as escalator service to provide entry or exit to/from the metro station
 Entry/Exit point B: Elevator (located towards Shri Adichunchanagiri Mutt)
 Entry/Exit point C: Towards Shri Adichunchanagiri Mutt – has stairs to provide entry or exit to/from the metro station (Escalator is in construction)

See also
Bangalore
List of Namma Metro stations
Transport in Karnataka
List of metro systems
List of rapid transit systems in India
Bangalore Metropolitan Transport Corporation

References

External links

 Bangalore Metro Rail Corporation Ltd. (Official site) 
 UrbanRail.Net – descriptions of all metro systems in the world, each with a schematic map showing all stations.

Namma Metro stations
Railway stations in India opened in 2015
2015 establishments in Karnataka